Allen Central High School (Allen Central, Central, or ACHS) was a Title I American high school located in Eastern, Floyd County, Kentucky, United States, and was one of four public high schools in the Floyd County School system. The school colors were Columbia blue and gray; however, over time dark red has been added.

Built in the early 70s, with its first students being received in the fall of 1972, the first principal at Allen Central was Dave Hensley. After his death, a bridge that carries Kentucky Route 80 in front of Allen Central Middle School and Hensley's former home was renamed the Dave Hensley Memorial Bridge.

The nickname of Allen Central is Rebels. American football games are played on Rebel Field. Basketball, volleyball and archery are played in the J. H. Campbell Gymnasium. The school plays host to many county and district tournaments due to its centralized location.

In 2014, plans were made to consolidate Allen Central and South Floyd High School into a new Floyd Central High School, located near the Allen Central campus. The new school is expected to open in the fall of 2017. At that time, Allen Central will be converted into a technical education hub for the Floyd County school district, while South Floyd High will be converted to an elementary school.

Mascot and flag scandals

For the past 34 years, the school has displayed symbols of the Confederate States of America. A Confederate flag was displayed in the school gymnasium as recently as January 2007, and the school mascot is a Confederate soldier who, as of late 2006, appeared on a sign at the entrance to the school. A nearby courtyard has blue brick forming the Cross of St. Andrew, and a mural in the lobby shows a rebel soldier carrying the flag on horseback. Other images of rebel soldiers and Confederate flags cover the same walls. The images have stoked controversy, since many consider them to be racist symbols, whether in Floyd County, in Kentucky, and elsewhere, although there is also support in the county for retaining the symbols.

Allen Central adopted the school flag and mascot in 1972, when four other schools were consolidated to form the high school. Students formed a committee and chose the mascot. The four previous schools and their mascots were the Maytown Wildcats, the Garrett Black Devils, the Wayland Wasps and the Martin Purple Flash.

Academic courses
Allen Central High School provides 33 main courses along with participation in the Floyd County Early College Academy. They include:

 Mathematics: Algebra I, Algebra II, Geometry, Precalculus, Calculus
 Social studies: Introduction to Social Studies, World Civilizations, History, Geography, Psychology, United States History, Sociology
 The Sciences: Integrated Science I, Integrated Science II, Biology, Human Anatomy, Biomedical Science
 English Language Arts: English I, English II, English III, English IV, English Communications
 Enrichment: Junior Reserve Officers' Training Corps, Practical Living Studies, Music, Guitar, Physical Education, Health, Art, Drama
 Foreign languages: Spanish I, Spanish II
 On-campus college credit classes: College Algebra, College Precalculus, English 100, English 200, Music 100

Sports
Boys' Basketball, Girls' Basketball, Volleyball, Archery, American Football, Baseball, Softball

Extracurricular activities
Academic Team, NHD History Club, Kentucky Youth Assembly, Math Club, Drama Club, Student Tech. Leadership Program, Yearbook Team

Notes

 
 
  Eastern Kentucky students hold onto Confederate school symbols
 

Schools in Floyd County, Kentucky
Public high schools in Kentucky
Educational institutions established in 1972
1972 establishments in Kentucky
Educational institutions disestablished in 2017
2017 disestablishments in Kentucky
Flag controversies in the United States